Major James Edward Ignatius Masterson VC (20 June 1862 – 24 December 1935) was an Irish recipient of the Victoria Cross, the highest and most prestigious award for gallantry in the face of the enemy that can be awarded to British and Commonwealth forces.

Early career
Masterson entered the Royal Irish Fusiliers in 1881, and served in the 1882 Anglo-Egyptian War, including the Battle of Tel-el-Kebir. He was commissioned a second lieutenant in the Devonshire Regiment on 15 July 1891, served in Burma from 1891 to 1892, and was promoted to lieutenant on 16 April 1895. From 1897 to 1898 he served with the 1st battalion of his regiment in the Tirah Campaign in the North-West Frontier of India under Sir William Lockhart.

Second Boer War
The Second Boer War broke out in South Africa in October 1899, and the British government soon realized they would need more troops. Masterson arrived in late 1899 with the 1st battalion of his regiment, and were involved in the Relief of Ladysmith.

Victoria Cross
Masterson was 37 years old, and a lieutenant in the 1st Battalion, Devonshire Regiment, when the following deed took place on 6 January 1900, at Wagon Hill, Ladysmith, South Africa for which he was awarded the VC:

He was severely wounded during the action, and placed in a field hospital. In February 1900 he was promoted to captain (the appointment was dated back to 1 January 1900). After returning to active service, he received a brevet promotion to major on 29 November 1900 (gazetted in a 1901 South Africa Honours list), and stayed in South Africa until after the war formally ended in June 1902.

His battalion had transferred to British India, and Masterson left Point Natal on the SS Ionian in November 1902 to join it at Ranikhet, Bengal Presidency.

Later career
He transferred to the King's Own Royal Lancaster Regiment as a Major in 1911 and retired in 1912. In 1914 he returned to the Army as a deputy director of Railway Transport. He died at Waterlooville, Hampshire, England, on 24 December 1935, aged 73.

His Victoria Cross is displayed at the Military Museum of Devon and Dorset, Dorchester, Dorset, England.

His ancestor, also surnamed Masterson, captured a Napoleonic eagle at Barossa in 1811 and was given a field commission; this is portrayed in Bernard Cornwell's Sharpe's Fury.

References

The Register of the Victoria Cross (1981, 1988 and 1997)

Ireland's VCs  (Dept of Economic Development, 1995)
Monuments to Courage (David Harvey, 1999)
Irish Winners of the Victoria Cross (Richard Doherty & David Truesdale, 2000)

External links
Location of grave and VC medal (Hampshire)
Angloboerwar.com

Second Boer War recipients of the Victoria Cross
Irish recipients of the Victoria Cross
Devonshire Regiment officers
King's Own Royal Regiment officers
1862 births
1935 deaths
19th-century Irish people
Irish officers in the British Army
Royal Irish Fusiliers soldiers
British Army personnel of the Anglo-Egyptian War
British military personnel of the Tirah campaign
British Army personnel of the Second Boer War
British Army personnel of World War I
British Army recipients of the Victoria Cross